I Know You Know is a 2008 feature film written and directed by Justin Kerrigan, his first major work since his debut with Human Traffic in 1999.

The film is about a young boy who becomes involved with his father's espionage work. His father wants to finish one more job before they can both move to a better life in America. However, things do not go to plan.

This movie was filmed in Wales and many other locations within the United Kingdom.

Cast
 Robert Carlyle - Charlie
 Arron Fuller - Jamie
 David Bradley - Mr Fisher
 Karl Johnson - Ernie
 Howard Marks - Jack
 Ross O'Hennessy as The Desk Sgt.
 Ryan Spriggs as Annoying Bully
 Christian Patterson as Policeman John

References

External links

2008 drama films
2008 films
British drama films
2000s English-language films
2000s British films